The Clytrini are a tribe within the leaf beetle subfamily Cryptocephalinae, though historically they were often treated as a distinct subfamily, Clytrinae. As the other Cryptocephalinae, they belong to the group of case-bearing leaf beetles known as Camptosomata.

Clytrini are known for their myrmecophily.

Selected genera and species

 Anomoea Agassiz, 1846
 Anomoea flavokansiensis Moldenke, 1970
 Anomoea laticlavia Forster, 1771
 Anomoea nitidicollis Schaeffer, 1919
 Anomoea rufifrons Lacordaire, 1848
 Babia Chevrolat, 1836
 Babia quadriguttatus Olivier, 1796
 Babia tetraspilota Leconte, 1858
 Cheilotoma Chevrolat, 1836
 Chilotomina
 Clytra Laicharting, 1781
Clytra laeviuscula Ratzeburg, 1837
 Coleorozena Moldenke, 1981
 Coleorozena alicula Fall, 1927
 Coleorozena fulvilabris Jacoby, 1888
 Coleorozena lecontii Crotch, 1873
 Coleorozena longicollis Jacoby, 1888
 Coleorozena pilatei Lacordaire, 1848
 Coleorozena subnigra Schaeffer, 1905
 Coleorozena vittata Leconte, 1858
 Coleothorpa Moldenke, 1981
 Coleothorpa aenescens Crotch, 1873
 Coleothorpa axillaris Leconte, 1868
 Coleothorpa dominicana Fabricius, 1801
 Coleothorpa mucorea Leconte, 1858
 Coleothorpa seminuda Horn, 1892
 Coleothorpa vittigera Leconte, 1861
 Coptocephala Chevrolat, 1836
 Coscinoptera Lacordaire, 1848
 Coscinoptera aeneipennis Leconte, 1858
 Coscinoptera panochensis Gilbert, 1981
 Labidostomis Chevrolat, 1836
 Lachnaia Chevrolat, 1836
 Macrolenes
 Megalostomis Chevrolat, 1836
 Megalostomis dimidiata Lacordaire, 1848
 Megalostomis pyropyga Lacordaire, 1848
 Megalostomis subfasciata Leconte, 1868
 Melitonoma
 Otiocephala
 Otiothraea
 Saxinis Lacordaire, 1848
 Saxinis apicalis Leconte, 1884
 Saxinis deserticola Moldenke, 1970
 Saxinis hornii Fall, 1909
 Saxinis knausii Schaeffer, 1906
 Saxinis omogera Lacordaire, 1848
 Saxinis saucia Leconte, 1857
 Saxinis sierramadrensis Moldenke, 1970
 Saxinis sinuate Schaeffer, 1906
 Saxinis sonorensis Jacoby, 1889
 Saxinis subpubescens Schaeffer, 1906
 Smaragdina Chevrolat, 1836
 Smaragdina militaris Leconte, 1858
 Tituboea
 Urodera Lacordaire, 1848
 Urodera crucifera Lacordaire, 1848
 Urodera dilaticollis Jacoby, 1889

References

 
Taxa named by Jean Théodore Lacordaire